Jesús Abdallah Castillo Molina (born 11 June 2001) is a Peruvian professional footballer who plays as a defensive midfielder for Peruvian Primera División club Sporting Cristal and the Peru national team.

Honours 
Sporting Cristal

 Peruvian Primera División: 2020
 Copa Bicentenario: 2021

References 

2001 births
Living people
Sportspeople from Callao
Peruvian footballers
Association football midfielders
Sporting Cristal footballers
Peruvian Primera División players
Peru international footballers